Manuel González Zeledón (24 December 1864 – 29 May 1936) was a Costa Rican writer. Writing under the nom-de-plume "Magón", he also worked to promote culture and literature in the country.

While his literary output was not prolific, he is remembered for works that serve to cast light on the people and culture of Costa Rica.

Born in San José, he began his writing career on the newspaper La Patria, which at the time was edited by the writer Aquileo J. Echeverría. Later, in conjunction with other writers, he founded the newspaper El País, opposing clerical interference in the government of the country.

In 1932 he was appointed ambassador the United States, a position he still held at the time of his death.

See also
Magón National Prize for Culture, Costa Rica's highest cultural award, named in his honour.

1864 births
1936 deaths
Costa Rican male writers
Costa Rican diplomats
Ambassadors of Costa Rica to the United States
Writers from San José, Costa Rica